Portrait of George Dyer and Lucian Freud was a 1967 oil on canvas painting by the Irish-born artist Francis Bacon, which he destroyed before it left his studio, though it was photographed and is highly regarded by art critics. Bacon was a ruthless self critic, and often abandoned paintings mid-work, or slashed finished canvases; something he often later regretted.

The painting is the first to show his lover George Dyer clothed, wearing a jacket, shirt and tie. He is shown in a frenetic manner, full of life, confidence and panache, with his head turning from side to side as he addresses company. The portrait is one of the few to show Dyer as people other than Bacon might have seen him in his prime; charming, engaging and physically attractive. In contrast Lucian Freud is a ball of tension, his hands tightly gripped and placed on his leg. Both men are set in what appears to be a pub, and before heavy green curtains reminiscent of those in Bacon's studio. The linear curtain folds resemble those in Bacon's famed pope series of the 1950s.

Notes

Sources

 Dawson, Barbara; Sylvester, David. Francis Bacon in Dublin. London: Thames & Hunson, 2000. 
 Farr, Dennis; Peppiatt, Michael; Yard, Sally. Francis Bacon: A Retrospective. NY: Harry N Abrams, 1999. 
 Peppiatt, Michael. Anatomy of an Enigma. Westview Press, 1996. 
 Russell, John, Francis Bacon (World of Art). London: Norton, 1971. 
 Zweite, Armin (ed). The Violence of the Real. London: Thames and Hudson, 2006. 

1967 paintings
20th-century portraits
Portraits by Francis Bacon
Lost paintings